Fillmore Unified School District is a public school district in the city of Fillmore, in the Santa Clara River Valley and Ventura County, California.

In 1985 several area parents asked for English to be the sole language of instruction, including Mexican Americans, while the school district wanted most children in bilingual English-Spanish classes for fear of having Spanish speakers isolated from English speakers.

Schools
Secondary:
 Fillmore High School
 Sierra High School
 Fillmore Middle School

Primary:
 Mountain Vista Elementary School
 Piru Elementary School (Piru)
 Rio Vista Elementary School
 San Cayetano Elementary School

Other:
 Fillmore Adult School

References

External links
 

Fillmore, California
School districts in Ventura County, California